This is a list of state highways in West Bengal, India.

Introduction
West Bengal state has a good road network. There are 15  state highways.

List of state highways in West Bengal

Others
 North-South Road Corridor

References

 
 

State Highways
 
West Bengal State Highways
State Highways